The Roller Coaster, often nicknamed the White Roller Coaster by many locals due to the previously white color, is the oldest roller coaster at Lagoon Amusement Park in Farmington, Utah. It is a wooden roller coaster owned by Lagoon. Built in 1921 and operating ever since, the Roller Coaster is the seventh oldest roller coaster in the world and the fourth oldest in the United States.

History
The Roller Coaster was designed by John A. Miller and opened in 1921. In 1953, a fire that spread across the west side of the Midway damaged the coaster, meaning the station and lift hill had to be rebuilt.  Over the years it has had computer upgrades and new trains installed. In 2005, it became an ACE Roller Coaster Landmark for being a classic coaster. In October 2012, it was listed on the National Register of Historic Places.

The ride has been known as the Lagoon Dipper, Silver Coaster and Giant Coaster, but its current official name is simply Roller Coaster. Locals often call it the White Roller Coaster because it was painted white for several decades. Around 2004, the park stopped painting the ride as rebuilt portions were constructed using treated lumber. Since then it has gradually changed in color from white to natural brown. However, some people continue calling it the White Roller Coaster despite it now being mostly brown.

In early 2018, new Great Coasters International trains replaced the former 4x3x2 Philadelphia Toboggan Coasters trains. The station was also reconfigured with the entrance and exit swapped. The ride experience was not changed however.

Layout
The Roller Coaster starts with a turn out of the station and over to the lift hill where it rises . The train then plunges down the first hill and up the next and down again around the west turn and into several more series of hills gradually getting smaller around two more turns before returning to the station.

Accidents
A number of accidents have occurred on the Roller Coaster since its opening. In 1989, a 13-year-old girl was attempting to get air by straightening her legs, allowing her to lift out of her seat when she slipped out from under the restraint and fell 35 feet to her death. She died at the scene. Lagoon made safety adjustments to the trains before reopening the ride that year and new restraints were added the following year. At least two more deaths have occurred over the years. In 1934, Henry Howe, 20, of Ogden, Utah fell to his death as he attempted to stand up when the train was on its highest hill. Howe hit a number of support trestles on the way down. In 1946, James Young Hess was struck by the train as he was working on scaffolding on the ride. Hess suffered skull, leg and arm fractures and internal injuries before dying on September 1, 1946.

See also

 National Register of Historic Places listings in Davis County, Utah

References

External links

 

Lagoon (amusement park)
Buildings and structures on the National Register of Historic Places in Utah
National Register of Historic Places in Davis County, Utah
1921 establishments in Utah